William-Francis Burl (6 January 1905 – 5 October 1966) was a British racing cyclist. He rode in the 1937 Tour de France.

References

1905 births
1966 deaths
British male cyclists
Place of birth missing